Panonsko Lake is an artificial lake of Bosnia and Herzegovina. It is located in the municipality of Tuzla. This lake is commonly used as a leisure spot by both tourists and locals alike.

See also
List of lakes of Bosnia and Herzegovina

References

Lakes of Bosnia and Herzegovina